OoiKotlas Airport  is a small airport in Arkhangelsk Oblast, Russia located 4 km southeast of Kotlas. It primarily services general aviation and small turboprop aircraft.

There is passenger service to Arkhangelsk (Vaskovo Airport) three times per week.

Airlines and destinations

References

 

Airports built in the Soviet Union
Airports in Arkhangelsk Oblast